Burlington High School may refer to:

 Burlington High School (Iowa), in Burlington, Iowa
 Burlington High School (Kansas), in Burlington, Kansas
 Burlington High School (Massachusetts), in Burlington, Massachusetts
 Burlington High School (Vermont), in Burlington, Vermont
 Burlington High School (Wisconsin), in Burlington, Wisconsin
 Burlington High School (Wyoming) in Burlington, Wyoming

See also
 Burlington Catholic Central High School
 Burlington Central High School
 Burlington City High School
 Burlington College
 Burlington Township High School
 Burlington-Edison High School
 Northern Burlington County Regional High School